Leif Green is an American actor and production manager. He is perhaps best known for portraying Davey Jaworski one of the T-Birds in the Grease 2, the 1982 sequel to the 1978 motion picture Grease as well as the hero Eugene Groebe in the 1983 sex comedy film Joysticks.

Career
In addition to his lead roles in Grease 2 and Joysticks, Green has also appeared on six TV series and a documentary. Upon retiring from acting, he eventually became a production manager or production assistant, and from 2001 and 2006 he was a production manager and worked on three motion pictures (serving as an assistant production manager in two of these roles, as stated below).

Philanthropy

Green is extensively involved in fundraising for AIDS research and prevention. In an interview following the release of his film, Grease 2, he describes his activism including his work with AIDS Walk, and states that the firm has collectively raised over $100 million to support AIDS patients.

Filmography

Film

Television

Soundtrack

References

Sources
 

American male film actors
American male television actors
Living people
Year of birth missing (living people)
Unit production managers